Stapfochloa is a genus of grasses. It is also in the subfamily Chloridoideae, and the Cynodonteae tribe.

Its native range is from Texas (USA) and Mexico, to tropical and subtropical South America (within the countries of Argentina, the Bahamas, Belize, Bolivia, Brazil, Colombia, Cuba, Dominican Republic, Guyana, Haiti, Jamaica, the Leeward Islands, Netherlands Antilles, Nicaragua, Paraguay, Puerto Rico, Uruguay, Venezuela and the Windward Islands) and also tropical Africa (within Burkina, Cameroon, Chad, Ethiopia, Kenya, Mali, Mauritania, Nigeria, Sudan, Tanzania and Uganda).
 
The genus name of Stapfochloa is in honour of Otto Stapf (1857–1933), an Austrian born botanist and taxonomist. 
It was first described and published in Willdenowia Vol.34 on page 131 in 2004.

Accepted species
According to Kew;

The genus is recognized by the United States Department of Agriculture and the Agricultural Research Service, they only list the following species; Stapfochloa berroi, Stapfochloa canterae, Stapfochloa ciliata, Stapfochloa elata and Stapfochloa lamproparia.

References

Chloridoideae
Poaceae genera
Plants described in 2004
Flora of Texas
Flora of Mexico
Flora of Central America
Flora of the Caribbean
Flora of northern South America
Flora of Bolivia
Flora of Colombia
Flora of Brazil
Flora of Argentina
Flora of Burkina Faso
Flora of Mali
Flora of Mauritania
Flora of Cameroon
Flora of Northeast Tropical Africa
Flora of East Tropical Africa